John McLaughlin's One on One is a weekly TV interview show that aired on American public broadcaster PBS. It was hosted by John McLaughlin, also the host of The McLaughlin Group. The show first aired in 1984  and produced its final program on May 24, 2013 after 29 years on the air.

References

English-language television shows
PBS original programming
1984 American television series debuts
2013 American television series endings
1980s American television news shows
1990s American television news shows
2000s American television news shows
2010s American television news shows
1980s American television talk shows
1990s American television talk shows
2000s American television talk shows
2010s American television talk shows